Feijenoord, not to be confused with the Feijenoord neighbourhood (which is located in the Feijenoord district), is a district in Rotterdam and is located south of the Nieuwe Maas. As of 1 January 2004 there were 72,320 inhabitants. The area is 6.44 km² (1.45 km² of this is water). It is not the current home of the city's main football club, Feyenoord, which is now in the neighbouring township of IJsselmonde.

The district gained significance in the 19th century as a centre of shipbuilding, principally at the Fijenoord yard.

Neighbourhoods in Feijenoord 
 Afrikaanderwijk
 Bloemhof
 Feijenoord
 Hillesluis
 Katendrecht
 Kop van Zuid
 Noordereiland
 Vreewijk

Ethnicity
The majority of the population of Feijenoord are immigrants, approximately 36% of the population are Dutch natives, 8% are western immigrants and 56% are non-western immigrants.
The biggest non-western immigrant groups are Moroccan (10%), Netherlands Antillean (4%), Surinamese (11%) and Turks (19%).

Problematic neighbourhoods
According to a list made by Eberhard van der Laan (State Secretary of infrastructure), four out of the eight neighbourhoods in Feijenoord are amongst the most problematic neighbourhoods in the Netherlands.
The Bloemhof neighbourhood ranks at number 4 on the list, making it the most problematic neighbourhood in its district and the second in the south of Rotterdam, followed by Hillesluis at rank 13, Afrikaanderwijk at rank 33 and Vreewijk at rank 44.

Poverty
Around 29% of the total population of Feijenoord lives on welfare, while the average for Rotterdam is 21%.
Bloemhof and Hillesluis neighbourhoods have an unemployment rate above 40%, which is higher than the average for Rotterdam (13%) and the Netherlands (6%).
63% of the population of Feijenoord has a low level of educational attainment, compared to the Rotterdam average of 49%.

Images

References

External links
 Official website
 History of Feijenoord

Boroughs of Rotterdam